The Yosemite Valley Bridges are eight bridges in the Yosemite Valley of Yosemite National Park, most of them spanning the Merced River. Five of them were built in 1928, with the remainder built between 1921 and 1933. The bridges feature a concrete structure faced with local stone, in an elliptical or three-centered arch configuration. They are notable for their uniform character and for their conformance to tenets of the National Park Service rustic style. Design work for the seven newer bridges was by George D. Whittle of the San Francisco District Office of the U.S. Bureau of Public Roads for the National Park Service. Concrete bridges were chosen at the urging of Thomas Chalmers Vint of the Park Service, in lieu of alternative designs for steel truss bridges, or suspension bridges suggested by the park superintendent.

Individual bridges
The Yosemite Creek Bridge is the oldest, carrying Northside Drive and spanning Yosemite Creek below Yosemite Falls. Built in 1922, it spans  in a single arch of reinforced concrete faced with granite. The bridge originally featured lanterns on the buttresses at either end of the bridge. It replaced an earlier bridge, referred to as "the little red bridge."

It carries the Mirror Lake Road, framing a view of Half Dome for eastbound traffic. Cost was $59,913.09.

Cost was $40,061.22. The bridge carries the  Curry Stables Road, a  sidewalk and a  bridle path.

The Pohono Bridge (1928) spans  over the Merced, carrying the  Southside Drive and a  bridle path, at a cost of $29,081.55.

The Sugar Pine Bridge (1928), also historically known as the Kenneyville Bridge No. 2, spans  at a five-degree skew across the Merced, with a  roadway, a  sidewalk and a  sidewalk. It carries the Mirror Lake Road. The longest span of the eight bridges, the cost was $73,507.44. The bridge was named for a large sugar pine that grew to the north of the eastern bridge abutment.

The Tenaya Creek Bridge (1928) spans Tenaya Creek with a single  arch at a 25-degree skew on the Happy Isles-Mirror Lake Road. The bridge carries the standard roadway, bridle path and sidewalk. Cost was $37,749.16.

Cost was $46,673.03.

The Stoneman Bridge (1933) resembles the Clark and Happy Isles bridges, with a  main span over the Merced carrying the  Northside Drive and two  sidewalks. It is located at the Camp Curry intersection. Cost was $71,675.08. The bridge replaced a wooden bridge that had carried the former "Royal Arch Avenue" to the Stoneman Hotel, which had been demolished by the 1920s. Construction on the bridge was started by Sullivan and Sullivan of Oakland, California, but was terminated when the Bureau of Public Roads lost confidence in the contractor's ability to carry out the work. The bridge was completed by the Portland, Oregon firm of Kueckenberg & Wittman.

The bridges were listed as a historic district on the National Register of Historic Places on November 25, 1977.

Future status
The National Park Service will release a Draft Environmental Impact Statement for their Merced River Plan in October 2012. The DEIS may contain a proposal to remove the Ahwahnee, Stoneman, and Sugar Pine bridges. The Merced River was included into the Wild and Scenic River system by Congress and signed into law by President Ronald Reagan in 1987. The NPS is required to consider several alternatives before implementing a final plan to maintain a free-flowing river as described in the law. One option being considered is the removal of the three bridges, but it is not certain the bridge removal option will be included in the Merced River Plan DEIS. Once the DEIS is released, there will be a 90-day public comment period.

See also
List of bridges documented by the Historic American Engineering Record in California

References

External links

 

Bridges in Mariposa County, California
Merced River
Rustic architecture in California
Bridges completed in 1922
Bridges completed in 1928
Bridges completed in 1929
Bridges completed in 1933
Road bridges on the National Register of Historic Places in California
National Register of Historic Places in Mariposa County, California
National Register of Historic Places in Yosemite National Park
Historic American Engineering Record in California
Historic districts on the National Register of Historic Places in California
Concrete bridges in California